The Ministry of Commerce, Industry and Cooperatives (MCIC, in Gilbertese, Botaki ibukin Ioninibwai, Karaobwai ao Boboti) is a government ministry of Kiribati, headquartered in South Tarawa.

Ministers
Taomati Iuta (1979–1982) for Trade, Industry and Labour
Ioteba Redfern (2003–2007)
Taberannang Timeon (2007–2013)
Tananei Marea (2016–2018)
Atarake Nataara (2016–2020)
Booti Nauan (2020–)

External link
MCIC

References

Government of Kiribati
Trade ministries
Cooperatives ministries
Industry ministries